Arthur Gordon (born 1910) was Dean of Ross from 1968 to 1978.

Gordon was educated at Trinity College, Dublin; and ordained in 1942.   After a curacy in Kinsale he held incumbencies at Kilmeen (1943–47); Carrigaline, (1947–62); and Clonmel, (1962–78). He was precentor of Ross Cathedral from 1964 to 1967; and chancellor of the Diocese of Cork, Cloyne and Ross from 1976 to 1978.

References

1910 births
Possibly living people
Alumni of Trinity College Dublin
Deans of Ross, Ireland